Kevin Sargent (born March 31, 1969) is a former American football Offensive tackle in the National Football League. He was signed by the Cincinnati Bengals as an undrafted free agent in 1992. He played college football at Eastern Washington.

1969 births
Living people
American football offensive tackles
Eastern Washington Eagles football players
Cincinnati Bengals players